The 2008 Champ Car World Series season would have been the 30th and final season of the series and the fifth instance of the Champ Car World Series.  It was scheduled to begin on April 20, 2008, and end on November 9 had the open-wheel unification not occurred. The season, with the sole exception of the Long Beach Grand Prix (won by Will Power), was canceled on February 21, 2008, because of the buyout of Champ Car by the rival IndyCar.

The Rexall Grand Prix of Edmonton and the Gold Coast Indy 300 were retained and transferred to the IndyCar Series schedule. The schedule included what would have been the first Monterey Grand Prix since 2004 and the supposed debut of the Champ Car Grand Prix of Spain. Some of the Champ Car races were scrapped.

Later on, Toronto (2009), Houston (2013), Road America (2016), Portland (2018), and Laguna Seca (2019) would also be revived by the unified series.

Races
The 2008 Champ Car schedule was announced in November 2007 before the unification announcement

 All 2008 Champ Car races were going to be run on road courses and street circuits.
 The Champ Car Grand Prix at Mazda Raceway Laguna Seca was set to return on May 18.
 The Champ Car Grand Prix of Spain was going to debut on June 8 at the Circuito Permanente de Jerez in Spain.

Team and driver lineup
The following teams and drivers were expected to compete for the 2008 Champ Car season. All teams would have used a Cosworth 2.65-litre turbocharged V8 engine, a Panoz DP01 chassis, and Bridgestone tires.

 The driver line-up represents the entry list for the Sebring Test.
  David Martínez was a test driver for Pacific Coast Motorsports.

See also
 2008 Atlantic Championship
 2008 Indianapolis 500
 2008 IndyCar Series
 2008 Indy Lights season

References

Champ Car seasons
Champ Car
2008 in Champ Car
Champ Car 2008
Champ Car World Series